Hesterman is a surname. Notable people with the surname include:

Wim Hesterman (1897–1971), Dutch boxer
Jan Hesterman (1893–1963), Dutch boxer
Charles Hesterman Merz (1874–1940), British engineer
Oran B. Hesterman, American non-profit company executive

See also
Westerman